Machimia illuminella is a moth in the family Depressariidae. It was described by August Busck in 1914. It is found in Panama.

The wingspan is about 17 mm. The forewings are golden brown with a brick-red costal edge with a black extreme edge. There are three indistinct darker brown transverse lines. The terminal edge is broadly dark brown. The hindwings are bright red.

References

Moths described in 1914
Machimia